Rafael Nadal was the defending champion but chose not to compete.

Federico Delbonis won the title, defeating Paolo Lorenzi in the final, 4–6, 6–3, 6–4

Seeds

Draw

Finals

Top half

Bottom half

Qualifying

Seeds

Qualifiers

Qualifying draw

First qualifier

Second qualifier

Third qualifier

Fourth qualifier

References
 Main Draw
 Qualifying Draw

Brasil Open - Singles
2014 Brasil Open